Edward Hibbert (born 9 September 1955) is an American-born British actor and literary agent. He played Gil Chesterton in the TV series Frasier. He also voiced Zazu in both The Lion King II: Simba's Pride and The Lion King 1½.

Early life
Hibbert was born on Long Island, New York, the son of actor Geoffrey Hibbert. He has one sister. He was raised in England, where he attended the Royal Academy of Dramatic Art. He returned to the US in the mid-1980s.

Career

Acting career
Hibbert had a starring role as Faulconbridge in the BBC's production of The Life and Death of King John, published in 1984. He has appeared on Broadway and in major regional theatre productions, worked in television as a series regular and guest star and also had roles in major films. In 1993 he won an Obie Award for his co-starring role of "Sterling" in Paul Rudnick's Jeffrey. His "Frederick Fellows/Philip Brent" in the National Theatre revival of Noises Off (presented at the Brooks Atkinson Theatre) was called "delightfully discombobulated" by one reviewer. Hibbert was in the Broadway musicals The Drowsy Chaperone and the 2007 premiere of Curtains (which reunited him with his Frasier co-star David Hyde Pierce). He appeared on Broadway as "Mr. Praed" (the architect) in Roundabout Theatre's 2010 production of Mrs. Warren's Profession starring Cherry Jones. He appeared on Broadway in the new musical It Shoulda Been You in 2015, again working with David Hyde Pierce, this time with Pierce as the director. He appeared in the 2019 Hollywood Bowl production of Into the Woods playing the Narrator.

He guest-starred on TV shows including Cosby, Murder, She Wrote and Law & Order: Special Victims Unit but is probably best known for his recurring role on Frasier as Gil Chesterton, KACL's haughty, effeminate restaurant critic.

As a voice actor, Hibbert has been the voice of Evil the Cat on the Earthworm Jim TV series, and the voice of Zazu in The Lion King II: Simba's Pride and in  The Lion King 1½, replacing Rowan Atkinson (who voiced him in the original film). His appearances in films include The Prestige, Taking Woodstock, and The First Wives Club.

Literary work
He is also a literary agent and was partner in the now-defunct literary agency Donadio & Olson, Inc. He has authors Chuck Palahniuk, Christopher Bram, Steven DeRosa, and Ed Sikov among his clients and has also represented film rights for Fight Club and Gods and Monsters plus others.

Personal life
Hibbert is gay. He says he's never come out of the closet, but never had to: "I think in England it's not the same. It's unspoken but understood."

Being an out actor has never been a problem, Hibbert says: "Being gay for me in Hollywood was not a problem. Someone once said, 'An Englishman and a homosexual is a distinction without a difference.' Everyone thinks all Englishmen are gay... "

Acting credits

Film

Television

Theatre

Video games

References

External links
 Edward Hibbert official website
 
 
 Production: The Drowsy Chaperone—Working in the Theatre Seminar video at American Theatre Wing.org, April 2006
 Donadio & Olson, Inc.

1955 births
Living people
Alumni of RADA
American emigrants to England
American male film actors
American male musical theatre actors
American male television actors
American male voice actors
American people of English descent
English male film actors
English male musical theatre actors
English male television actors
English male voice actors
English gay actors
American gay actors
LGBT people from New York (state)
Literary agents
Male actors from New York (state)
20th-century American male actors
20th-century English male actors
21st-century American male actors
21st-century English male actors